Celaenorrhinus milleri is a species of butterfly in the family Hesperiidae. It is found in Cameroon.

Adults are on wing nearly year-round.

Etymology
The species is named for Lee D. Miller, of the Allyn Museum.

References

Endemic fauna of Cameroon
Butterflies described in 2003
milleri